Chapra Lok Sabha constituency was in Bihar and it existed until 2008, after which it was replaced by Saran constituency when delimitation was done.

Vidhan Sabha segments 
Chapra (छपरा) Lok Sabha constituency comprises the following seven Vidhan Sabha (Legislative Assembly) segments:
 Taraiya
 Marhaura
Amnour
 Chapra
 Garkha
 Parsa
 Sonpur (सोनपुर, often spelt Sonepur in electoral records)

Members of Lok Sabha

  

In 2004, Lok Sabha polls were countermanded in Chapra (छपरा) following allegations of rigging. Re-poll was done on 31 May 2004. Lalu won the elections after the re-poll.

Election Results

1957 Election
 Rajendra Singh (PSP) : 75,994 votes   
 Leela Devi Verma (INC) : 73,046

1984 Election
 Ram Bahadur Singh (JNP) : 163,494 votes  
 Bhishma prasad Yadav (INC) : 137,488

1996 Election
 Rajiv Pratap Rudi (BJP) : 339,086 votes 
 Lal Babu Rai (JD) : 323,590

2004 Election
 Lalu Prasad (RJD) : 228,882 votes  
 Rajeev Pratap Rudy (BJP) : 168,459

See also
 Saran (Lok Sabha constituency)
 Saran district
 List of former constituencies of the Lok Sabha

References

Saran district
Former Lok Sabha constituencies of Bihar
Former constituencies of the Lok Sabha
2008 disestablishments in India
Constituencies disestablished in 2008